Metailurini is an extinct taxonomic tribe of large saber-toothed cats that lived in Africa, Asia, Europe, and North America from the Miocene to the Pleistocene.

The best known Metalurini genera are Dinofelis and Metailurus. Metailurini had canines longer than neofelids, but smaller than true saber toothed cats. The teeth were also are more conical than flat, so called "scimitar-toothed", having broad and mildly elongated upper canines. Like most extinct cats, the majority of species in Metailurini are known primarily from fragments. However, the systematic position and taxonomy of these creatures is now accepted as being true members of Felidae and descended from Proailurus and Pseudaelurus. Within Felidae, they had been traditionally considered to belong in Machairodontinae, albeit some have in the past proposed a relationship to Pantherinae, all phylogenetic analyses support the former classification but the monophyly of the taxon itself might not be supported.

Classification

Phylogeny
The phylogenetic relationships of Metailurini are shown in the following cladogram:

References

 

 
Machairodontinae
Mammal tribes
Miocene carnivorans
Miocene first appearances